Walter of Châtillon (Latinized as Gualterus de Castellione) was a 12th-century French writer and theologian who wrote in the Latin language. He studied under Stephen of Beauvais and at the University of Paris.  It was probably during his student years that he wrote a number of Latin poems in the Goliardic manner that found their way into the Carmina Burana collection. During his lifetime, however, he was more esteemed for a long Latin epic on the life of Alexander the Great, the Alexandreis, sive Gesta Alexandri Magni, a hexameter epic, full of anachronisms; he depicts the Crucifixion of Jesus as having already taken place during the days of Alexander the Great. The Alexandreis was popular and influential in Walter's own times. Matthew of Vendôme and Alan of Lille borrowed from it and Henry of Settimello imitated it, but it is now seldom read. One line, referring to Virgil's Aeneid, is sometimes quoted:

 

Many poems in his style, or borrowing his themes, have been attributed to Walter on insufficient evidence. For example, he was not the author of the satirical Apocalypse of Golias once attributed to him. In addition to his poems, Walter wrote a dialogue refuting Jewish thought and biblical interpretation and a treatise on the Trinity, and he was possibly the author of Moralium dogma philosophorum. He died of bubonic plague early in the 13th century.

David Townsend summarizes one commentary on Walter's life as follows:

References

F. J. E. Raby, A History of Secular Latin Poetry in the Middle Ages, Vol. 2, Oxford: Clarendon Press, 1934, pp. 72–80, 190–204.

External links
Catholic Encyclopedia: Walter of Chatillon
Gautier de Châtillon at Association de généalogie des familles Gauthier
  
Online works in Latin
Alexandreis (Bibliotheca Augustana)
Satirical poems of Walter of Châtillon with translation by Robert Levine
Contra Judaeos, De Trinitate (Patrologia Latina via Google Books)

12th-century births
13th-century deaths from plague (disease)
Medieval Latin poets
French Christian theologians
12th-century French poets
University of Paris alumni
12th-century Latin writers
12th-century French writers
Infectious disease deaths in France
Goliardic poetry
French male poets